The Basilica of St Plechelmus (Dutch: Sint-Plechelmusbasiliek) is a Catholic church in the Dutch town of Oldenzaal dedicated to the 8th-century Irish monk Plechelm, whose festival on 15 July has been on the calendar of the medieval diocese of Utrecht ever since his canonisation in the 10th century. This festival is still celebrated annually at the basilica, and the saint's 1050th anniversary was celebrated there in 2004.

History
The oldest parts of the existing building date from the middle and the second half of the 12th century, but the history of the church goes back to the 8th century, when the traveling missionary Plechelmus founded the first church on the site, the Silvester Church, initially dedicated to pope Silvester and sometime before 954 rededicated to Plechelmus himself (canonised after the elevation of his relics). In 954, bishop Balderic of Utrecht founded a chapter in Oldenzaal and expanded and restored the 8th-century church, allowing the relics of Plechelmus used on his canonisation to be transferred to it. Since then, the Plechelmus Church of Oldenzaal was held in high regard - for example, during the Middle Ages its chapter was one of only four outside Utrecht that could participate in electing the bishop of Utrecht.

On May 13, 1950, the church was awarded the honorary title of basilica minor by decision of Pope Pius XII.

 By royal decree of March 17, 2009, Queen Beatrix granted the request to grant a coat of arms to the basilica.

References

External links
Official website
 Over 140 pictures

12th-century churches
Roman Catholic churches in the Netherlands
Plechelmus
Churches in Overijssel
Towers in Overijssel
Gothic architecture in the Netherlands
Oldenzaal